Atractanthula is a genus of cnidarians belonging to the family Botrucnidiferidae.

Species:
 Atractanthula johni Leloup, 1964

References

Botrucnidiferidae
Anthozoa genera